Eric McIntyre Murray (12 December 1941 – 7 November 2016) was a Scottish footballer who played for Kilmarnock and St Mirren as a wing half.

Murray was a regular part of the Kilmarnock side that won the Scottish league championship in 1964–65. Kilmarnock then played in the 1965–66 European Cup against Real Madrid; Murray was tasked with marking the Hungarian great Ferenc Puskás.

References

1941 births
2016 deaths
Footballers from South Ayrshire
Scottish footballers
Association football wing halves
Kilmarnock F.C. players
St Mirren F.C. players
Cumnock Juniors F.C. players
Scottish Football League players
Scottish Junior Football Association players